Kevin McCabe is an English property businessman.

Business career

Scarborough Group
A native of Sheffield, McCabe set up the property company Scarborough Group in 1980. Since then McCabe and his family's ownership of the Scarborough group has branched out into the Far East and China. The group owns Forsyth plc, which runs serviced office operations across the UK including the Blades Enterprise Centre at Sheffield United F.C ground, the Blades' home in Sheffield, and also a 20% stake in both Frasers Property (UK) Ltd and FairBriar Holdings Ltd.

In June 2007, McCabe sold his entire 60 per cent stake in Scamp Holdings Ltd, a subsidiary company of his Scarborough group which owned a real estate investment management operation, together with a significant portfolio of real estate across Europe, to the Australian company, Valad for £850 million. Following the deal McCabe retained a position on the board until his resignation in October 2009 after receiving the final $56.5 million payment for the European property assets.

The Scarborough Group has actively invested in the property sector in China since 2003 with the most high-profile project being the partnership with Top Spring Group in which Scarborough has a substantial stake and McCabe is vice-chairman.  Scarborough also has a significant stake in Rainbow Department Stores, following its demerger from Top Spring in 2009.

Sheffield United 

A supporter of Sheffield United, McCabe formed a £50m joint venture between Sheffield United and Scarborough Holdings to invest in low-risk commercial property. United Scarborough, a £50m property joint-venture with his Scarborough property vehicle, sold two properties for a £1.6 million profit, £800,000 of which expanded the 2006–07 profit/loss margin.

Sheffield United acquired a 90% controlling stake in Chengdu Football Club in January 2006, and changed the name of the club to Chengdu Blades Football Club. Then in November 2010 it was reported by various media sources that the club was to sell the majority of its stake in Chengdu Blades as Sheffield United announced losses of nearly £19 million.

Carlos Tevez affair
In May 2007, McCabe launched a legal fight against an independent commission's decision not to punish West Ham United F.C. with a points deduction after the signing of Carlos Tevez and Javier Mascherano. which was believed to be breaching rules governing the ownership of football players. Sheffield United were relegated from English football Premier League on the final day of 2006–07 season. McCabe said that Sheffield United would turn to the European Commission for compensation if an independent arbitration panel failed to overturn their relegation from the Premiership.

A statement made by the committee on 17 June explained that ''"Sheffield United are asking the arbitral panel to determine two matters. The first, is whether the decision by the independent disciplinary commission on 27 April to fine West Ham, rather than dock points, was legally flawed such as to require the issue to be determined afresh by a disciplinary commission at some point in the future. The second is whether the Premier League acted unlawfully by not de-registering Tevez. Fulham are seeking similar relief. The arbitral panel have no power to decide what the penalty to be imposed upon West Ham should be. This will be within the exclusive remit of the disciplinary commission, if one is convened as a result of the arbitral panel's decision."

A two-day arbitration tribunal was held on 18 June 2007 to examine the decision by an independent committee set up by the Premier League not to dock West Ham United league points for breaching rules governing the ownership of football players.

McCabe and Sheffield United subsequently lost their arbitration appeal after the tribunal found in favour of the FA Premier League on both issues and dismissed the claims of Sheffield United. The three-man panel did not have the power to change West Ham's punishment but could have ordered a new independent commission to judge the case. The tribunal said they had "sympathy" with "the Blades", while West Ham had been "deliberately deceitful" and yet remained in the Premier League.

As a result of the hearing, McCabe announced that Sheffield United would be "going to the High Court to appeal". McCabe accepted that Sheffield United will not be reinstated to the Premier League, but would be looking for up to £50m in compensation.

On 13 July 2007, Sheffield United lost its High Court appeal against the Premier League. An arbitration panel upheld the original decision not to dock West Ham points over the transfers of Tevez and Mascherano. The Blades went into the High Court hearing seeking to prove that the arbitration panel made an "error in law" by not ordering a new disciplinary commission to deal with the affair – but the High Court rejected the argument. McCabe continued to insist the club is due compensation, and indicated "other avenues that I think may be worth pursuing" after the High Court ruling.

Sheffield United initiated legal proceedings against West Ham United on 16 August 2007, for substantial compensation after the club was relegated from the Premier League in 2006–07 season. United have estimated the cost of their relegation at between £30million and £50million. The Blades subsequently failed in this High Court bid to force the Premier League to take disciplinary action against West Ham, and claim West Ham failed to disclose vital information at the hearing. However, West Ham deny Sheffield United's claims.

On 7 November 2007 McCabe confirmed that Sheffield United's case for compensation following their relegation from the Premier League would be heard by a Football Association tribunal in mid-2008. Having failed in their attempt to have the original punishment overturned, United will seek monetary recognition and a financial settlement. On 23 September 2008, McCabe revealed that the independent tribunal had finally ruled in his club's favour, finding that West Ham United F.C. did breach a duty to Sheffield United and should pay damages in an amount sufficient to compensate Sheffield United for the losses it suffered as a result of that breach of duty It was also revealed that the tribunal will decide on the amount of compensation to be paid at a later sitting.

In a statement on their club website West Ham United said that they would take legal advice before deciding whether to appeal the decision. On 15 October 2008, West Ham United filed an appeal with the Court of Arbitration for Sport. Subsequently, Sheffield United filed a response which denied the jurisdiction of the Court of Arbitration for Sport. The FA supported Sheffield United's position in a letter to the Court of Arbitration for Sport which stated that 'The FA's position is that any award made by an arbitration tribunal convened under FA Rules is final and binding on the parties. FA Rules do not provide for right of appeal to CAS'. On 10 November 2008, a hearing took place in the High Court in which Sheffield United were successful in their application for a temporary injunction to prevent West Ham United's appeal to the Court of Arbitration for Sport.

It was announced on 8 January 2009 that the FA and Premier League would launch a new inquiry into the conduct of West Ham United over the Carlos Tevez affair, in light of the findings of the independent tribunal which found that West Ham United were in further breach of Premier League rules after the independent disciplinary commission's decision of 27 April 2007 On 16 March 2009 Sheffield United and West Ham United announced that they had reached an out-of-court settlement. It has been reported that West Ham have agreed to pay between £15–£25 million although the actual figures have not been made public.

In a joint statement, Scott Duxbury, the West Ham chief executive and Kevin McCabe said: "Both clubs are pleased to announce that a satisfactory settlement for compensation has been reached which brings the dispute between Sheffield United and West Ham United to an end. The tribunal will not be resuming."

Resignation as Chairman of Sheffield United
In November 2010, Kevin McCabe announced that he would be stepping down as chairman of the club, to be replaced by vice-chairman Chris Steer, who would take over as chairman in December; however McCabe remained the owner and Chairman of Sheffield United PLC, the business side of the club.

Saudi Investment
On 30 August 2013 McCabe announced that Sheffield United had reached a deal with a foreign investor who will become equal owners of the club and will provide new funds. On 3 September it was confirmed that Saudi Prince Abdullah bin Mosaad Al Saud of the royal House of Saud and whose brother was a former President of Al-Hilal FC had bought a 50% stake in United's parent company 'Blades Leisure Ltd' for the fee of £1 with the promise of providing "substantial new capital" with the aim of returning the Blades to the Premier League as "quickly as possible".

In late 2017, McCabe served a roulette notice on Prince Abdullah, giving him the option to sell his 50 per cent at £5m or buy McCabe's 50 per cent for the same price. Prince Abdullah chose to buy but McCabe refused to sell, a decision that ended up before the High Court of Justice, Business and Property Courts of England and Wales. In September 2019, after 20 months of litigation, the High Court issued its judgment, requiring McCabe's company to sell its shares in Blades. McCabe sought permission to appeal from the High Court and Court of Appeal but both appeals were rejected. As a result, Prince Abdullah became the sole beneficial owner of the club.

See also 
 Central Coast Mariners
 Ferencvárosi TC
 Chengdu Blades

References 

English football chairmen and investors
Businesspeople from Sheffield
People from Norton Lees
Living people
1948 births
Sheffield United F.C. directors and chairmen
People from Scarborough, North Yorkshire